Nandanam is a village in Yadadri Bhuvanagiri district of Telangana, India. It falls under Bhongir mandal. Its population is 2449 as per 2011 census. Hyderabad is the nearest city.

References

Villages in Nalgonda district